Ferreira do Alentejo e Canhestros is a civil parish in the municipality of Ferreira do Alentejo, Portugal. It was formed in 2013 by the merger of the former parishes Ferreira do Alentejo and Canhestros. The population in 2011 was 5,140, in an area of 295.66 km2.

References

Freguesias of Ferreira do Alentejo